Glens Falls North is a census-designated place (CDP) in Warren County, New York, United States. It is part of the Glens Falls Metropolitan Statistical Area. The CDP population was 8,061 at the 2000 census. It lies north of the city of Glens Falls, in the town of Queensbury.

Geography

Demographics

As of the census of 2000, there were 8,061 people, 3,533 households, and 2,254 families residing in the CDP. The population density was 996.4 per square mile (384.7/km2). There were 3,689 housing units at an average density of 456.0/sq mi (176.1/km2). The racial makeup of the CDP was 96.96% White, 0.76% African American, 0.11% Native American, 1.04% Asian, 0.02% Pacific Islander, 0.29% from other races, and 0.82% from two or more races. Hispanic or Latino of any race were 1.31% of the population.

There were 3,533 households, out of which 27.7% had children under the age of 18 living with them, 51.3% were married couples living together, 9.9% had a female householder with no husband present, and 36.2% were non-families. 31.0% of all households were made up of individuals, and 17.1% had someone living alone who was 65 years of age or older. The average household size was 2.28 and the average family size was 2.86.

In the CDP, the population was spread out, with 22.8% under the age of 18, 6.2% from 18 to 24, 25.5% from 25 to 44, 26.1% from 45 to 64, and 19.4% who were 65 years of age or older. The median age was 42 years. For every 100 females, there were 86.2 males. For every 100 females age 18 and over, there were 81.4 males.

The median income for a household in the CDP was $42,424, and the median income for a family was $56,647. Males had a median income of $40,816 versus $25,388 for females. The per capita income for the CDP was $27,460. About 6.3% of families and 7.1% of the population were below the poverty line, including 12.4% of those under age 18 and 2.5% of those age 65 or over.

See also 
 List of census-designated places in New York

References

External links
  Detailed map of Glens Falls North and Queensbury

Queensbury, New York
Census-designated places in New York (state)
Glens Falls metropolitan area
Census-designated places in Warren County, New York